Under the Veil (literally "Have no equal in this world" etymology from Chinese idiom 舉世無雙) is a 2015 Hong Kong period, fantasy, comedy drama produced by TVB, starring  Wayne Lai, Bosco Wong, Raymond Wong Ho-yin, Sonija Kwok, Kristal Tin and Eliza Sam as the main cast. Filming took place from January to April 2014. The drama was broadcast on Hong Kong's Jade and HD Jade channels from September 28 through October 23, 2015 every Monday through Friday during its 8:30-9:30 pm timeslot with a total of 20 episodes.

The drama is the second of TVB's four 2015 grand anniversary dramas to be broadcast.

Under the Veil is a remake of TVB's 1981 drama Double Fantasies (無雙譜), starring Louise Lee, Maggie Li, Andy Lau, Kent Tong.

Synopsis
The drama is told in three separate folktales about love, lust, vanity, greed and selfishness.

Changing Pins
Male and female fraternal twins, with the same appearance, fall in love with different people. The older male twin has an affair with a Princess of the Liao Kingdom, while the female twin falls in love with a poor scholar with amnesia.

Duen Fung-Sam and Duen So-Sei are boy-girl twins from the royal Duen Family. Fung-Sam is the older of the twins who grew up with prince Sing-Chi. Sing-Chi suspects the old General Song Dak and his son are planning a rebellion against the emperor and are secretly contacting the Liao Kingdom. Sing-Chi ask Fung-Sam to help them gain evidence of their treachery by going undercover as a spy in Liao.

Fung-Sam gets close to the princess of Liao to gather intel and falls in love with her. After his success, the princess commits a suicide as an apology to her kingdom.

Fung-Sam returns with evidence: a secret letter written by Song-Dak to the king of Liao which states that if Song-Dak became the emperor, he would contribute the 16 States of Yanyun to Liao. Fung-Sam passes the evidence to prince Sing-Chi by using the flood-control system to avoid Song-Dak's spying.

When Sing-Chi and Fung-Sam are coming back to the capital by ships, they come under attack from Song-Dak's son, General Song-Lit. After the attack, only Fung-sam and the prince survives. However, Sing-Chi gets trapped in a cliff, and Fung-Sam comes back to the capital badly injured.

Meanwhile, So-Sei has been pretending to be her older brother to cover up his disappearance while he was in Liao and being treated for his injuries. So-Sei asks her master, who is also Fung-Sam's master, to save Fung-Sam. She falls in love with her childhood friend Yuen Sam-Yeung who is a poor artist.

Shi Loi-Fung, is a bird that used to be a princess of the Kucha Kingdom which used to pray to a devil. However, when the devil asked their group to contribute ten virgin boys and girls as sacrifices, they refused. In response, the devil destroyed the kingdom, with Princess Lap-ka surviving in the form of a statue. When the prince of the Song Dynasty, Chiu Sing-Chi, attempts to rescue her, Lap-ka transforms into a bird. She is renamed Shi Loi-Fung by Chiu Sing-Chi.

During the attack on the prince's ship, she was trying to rescue Sing-Chi against Song-Lit's wizard-craft but lost. Later, she enters Fung-Sam's dream, calling for reinforcement. Fung-Sam doesn't understand the bird language so he asks his master for help. With Loi-Fung's help, Fung-Sam and his master finally found the cliff and saved Sing-Chi from the cliff.

Song-Lit and his father were trying to sue Fung-Sam while he was having his injuries treated. However, So-Sei replaced her brother to prevent this from happening all along, which let Song-Lit know that So-Sei was standing in as her brother and Fung-Sam was hidden away. Song-Lit and his father received intel from Fung-Sam's reckless wife, Song-Dak's niece, and breaks into the place. Sou-Sei attempts to stop him from harming her brother but was struck by Song-Lit's dagger. Fung-Sam and his master came back from saving Sing-Chi's life to stop Song-Lit's further damage.

So-Sei died in her lover's arms. The secret letter was finally delivered to the Emperor King-Hei. Song-dak was put to trial, indicted for betrayal and sent to jail.

Chapter Story ends here.

Judge Lu
A poor scholar has an affair with a courtesan that resembles his wife.

Chasing Fish
A scholar becomes the object of affection to a fish spirit and human girl with the same face. The story is based on Yulan Ji.

Cast

Main cast
Kristal Tin as Dyun Fung-Sam and Dyun So-Sei.
Raymond Wong as Yuen Sam-Yueng and Yuen Yim-Siu
Katy Kung as princess Lap-Ka
Wayne Lai as school student Chu Yi-Dan and also as Mr. Lui Yat Pan-Heung's husband (a.k.a. Dry Thunder)
Sonija Kwok as prostitute Yat Pan-Heung and Chu's wife.
Bosco Wong as poor scholar Cheung Chan
Eliza Sam as rich girl Hung Mao-Dan and the koi spirit.
Joseph Lee as Kau Tsin-Sui, a nine thousand year-old tortoise and Bao Zheng, a justice officer.

Extended cast
Stanley Cheung as Chiu Shing Chi the Crown Prince
Raymond Chiu as Song-Lit, a villain with martial arts and wizard-craft. Song Dak's son. 
Choi Kwok-Hing as Song-Dak, the main antagonist of Chapter One. Song Lit's father.
Willie Wai as the red faced Deity who holds the book of Life and Death
Joyce Koi as Kun-Yam
Law Lok-lam 
Henry Lo as Miu Kwo-Tin, Fung-Sam and So-sei's master
Ali Lee as So-Sei's maid
Henry Yu as Emperor King-Hei, resembling the Chinese emperor Song Renzong in the history.
Wong Chun 
Rainbow Ching
Dickson Lee 
Sunny Tai 
Cindy Lee 
Adam Ip 
Anthony Ho 
Koo Koon-chung
Cecilia Fong as Emperor King-Hei's wife, prince Sing-Chi's mother.
Parkman Wong
Janice Shum as Fung-Sam's wife.
Eddie Ho
Kong Fu Keung
Kaka Chan
Kayley Chung
Osanna Chiu
Lucy Li
Rocky Cheng
Alex Lam Tak Shun
Kanice Lau
Kiko Leung
Darren Wong
Kelvin Yuen
Charles Fan
Wong Kim Wai
Hinson Chou

Development
In December 2013, TVB announced they will be remaking their 1981 drama Double Fantasies. 
The costume fitting ceremony was held on January 6, 2014 at 12:30 pm Tseung Kwan O TVB City Studio One.
The blessing ceremony took place on February 11, 2014 at 3:00 pm Tseung Kwan O TVB City Studio Thirteen.
Filming took place from January to April 2014, entirely on location in Hong Kong.
In March 2014, Under the Veil was one of ten TVB dramas previewed at FILMART 2014.
A promo image of Under the Veil was featured in TVB's 2015 calendar for the month of August.

Viewership ratings

International broadcast

Awards and nominations

References

External links
Official website 

TVB dramas
2015 Hong Kong television series debuts
2015 Hong Kong television series endings